Mark Langdon Hill (June 30, 1772 – November 26, 1842) was United States Representative from Massachusetts and from Maine.  He was born in Biddeford (then a part of the Province of Massachusetts Bay) on June 30, 1772.  He attended the public schools, then became a merchant and shipbuilder in Phippsburg. He was an overseer and trustee of Bowdoin College. He is the nephew of John Langdon. New Hampshire governor, Senator and patriot.

Hill was elected a member of the Massachusetts House of Representatives, and served in the Massachusetts State Senate. He served as judge of the court of common pleas in 1810.  He was elected a member of the American Antiquarian Society in 1816. He was elected as a Democratic-Republican from Massachusetts to the Sixteenth Congress (March 4, 1819 – March 3, 1821). Hill and John Holmes were the two of the seven representatives from the district of Maine willing to vote for the Missouri compromise, which on a 90-87 vote allowed Maine to become a state at the cost of letting Missouri be a slave state.  They were both strongly attacked in the Maine press for this compromise.

Hill was elected as a Democratic-Republican to the Seventeenth Congress from Maine after the state was admitted to the Union (March 4, 1821 – March 3, 1823). He was postmaster of Phippsburg 1819-1824.  He was appointed as a collector of customs at Bath in 1824. Hill died in Phippsburg on November 26, 1842.  His interment was in the churchyard of the Congregational Church in Phippsburg Center.

References

 
 

1772 births
1842 deaths
Massachusetts state senators
Members of the Massachusetts House of Representatives
Members of the United States House of Representatives from Maine
Politicians from Biddeford, Maine
Massachusetts Democratic-Republicans
Maine Democratic-Republicans
People from Bath, Maine
Democratic-Republican Party members of the United States House of Representatives from the District of Maine
Members of the American Antiquarian Society
People from Sagadahoc County, Maine